Degitu Azimeraw Asires (born 24 January 1999) is an Ethiopian long-distance runner. In 2019, she won the Amsterdam Marathon and set a new course record of 2:19:26.

She represented Ethiopia at the 2019 African Games, where she won the silver medal in the women's half marathon event.

Achievements

References

External links 
 

Living people
1999 births
Place of birth missing (living people)
Ethiopian female long-distance runners
Ethiopian female marathon runners
African Games silver medalists for Ethiopia
Athletes (track and field) at the 2019 African Games
African Games medalists in athletics (track and field)
21st-century Ethiopian women